William Dickinson may refer to:

People
William Dickinson (architect) (c. 1670–1724), English architect
William Dickinson (1745–1806), British Member of Parliament for Great Marlow 1768–1774, Rye 1777–1790 and Somerset 1796–1806
William Dickinson (Rastall) (1756–1822), English topographer and legal writer
William Dickinson (1771–1837), British Member of Parliament for Ilchester 1796–1802, Lostwithiel 1802–1806 and Somerset 1806–1831
William Louis Dickinson (1925–2008), American politician
William R. Dickinson (1931–2015), American geologist
William Dickinson (engraver) (1746–1826), English mezzotint engraver
William Austin Dickinson (1829–1895), American lawyer
William Boyd Dickinson (1908–1978), American war correspondent
William Croft Dickinson (1897–1963), English historian and author
William Howship Dickinson (1832–1913), British doctor
William Dickinson (cricketer) (1889–1948), Welsh cricketer and British Army officer
William Preston Dickinson (1889–1930), American modern artist
William Dickinson, a pseudonym used by Christine Arnothy (born 1930), French writer

Places
William L. Dickinson High School, in Jersey City, New Jersey

Dickinson, William